Events from the year 1861 in Canada.

Incumbents
Monarch — Victoria

Federal government
Parliament — 6th then 7th

Governors
Governor General of the Province of Canada — Edmund Walker Head
Colonial Governor of Newfoundland — Alexander Bannerman
Governor of New Brunswick — Arthur Charles Hamilton-Gordon
Governor of Nova Scotia — George Phipps, 2nd Marquess of Normanby
Governor of Prince Edward Island — Dominick Daly

Premiers
Joint Premiers of the Province of Canada —
George-Étienne Cartier, Canada West Premier
Antoine-Aimé Dorion, Canada East Premier 
Premier of Newfoundland — Hugh Hoyles
Premier of New Brunswick — Samuel Leonard Tilley
Premier of Nova Scotia — James William Johnston
Premier of Prince Edward Island — Edward Palmer

Events
April 12 - American Civil War starts
April 14 – A major flood hits Montreal
April 15 – Nova Scotia: resolution for provincial union by Joseph Howe for referral to the other British North American provinces in July.
May 13 – The UK declares its neutrality in American Civil War.
June 1 – The UK bans naval craft or privateers of American belligerents from carrying prizes into British ports or territorial waters.
November 8 – The Trent Affair: British packet steamer Trent stopped by United States warship in international waters. Two Confederate diplomats taken off and imprisoned in Boston.
November 28 – Viscount Monck becomes Governor-General.
December 3 – The UK sends reinforcements to British North America.
December 23 – The UK demands release of Confederate diplomats taken from Trent.
December 26 – Confederate diplomats taken from Trent released.

Full date unknown
Joseph Howe became Premier of Nova Scotia
Dr. Anderson Ruffin Abbott becomes the first Canadian-born Black to graduate from medical school.
1861 Newfoundland general election
The Cariboo Gold Rush starts in British Columbia.

Births

January to June

January 15 – Joseph-Mathias Tellier, politician (died 1952)
March 10 – Pauline Johnson, poet, writer and performer (died 1913)
March 10 – Clifford Sifton, politician and Minister (died 1929)
March 19 – Lomer Gouin, politician and 13th Premier of Quebec (died 1929)
March 20 – Herménégilde Boulay, politician (died 1942)
May 13 – Margaret Marshall Saunders, writer
April 15 – Bliss Carman, poet (died 1929)
June 7 – George Henry Murray, politician and Premier of Nova Scotia (died 1929)

July to December
July 11 – John Best, politician (died 1923)
September 5 – Tobias Norris, politician and 10th Premier of Manitoba (died 1936)
September 18 – Ella Cora Hind, journalist and women's rights activist (died 1942)
September 19 – Charles Ernest Gault, politician (died 1946)
October 31 – James Bowman, politician (died 1940)
November 4 – Raoul Dandurand, politician (died 1942)
November 6 – James Naismith, sports coach and innovator, inventor of basketball (died 1939)
November 17 – Archibald Lampman, poet (died 1899)
November 26 – Laura Borden, wife of Robert Borden, 8th Prime Minister of Canada (died 1940)
December 22 – Sara Jeannette Duncan, author and journalist (died 1922)

Deaths
February 3 – Louis-Théodore Besserer, notary, soldier, politician, and businessman (born 1785)
February 13 – Denis-Benjamin Viger, politician, businessman and politician (born 1774)
November 9 – Howard Douglas, soldier, educator, author, inventor, and colonial administrator (born 1776)

References 

 

 
Years of the 19th century in Canada
Canada
1861 in North America